Baron Sándor Korányi de Tolcsva (Pest, 18 June 1866 – Budapest, 12 April 1944) was a Hungarian physician specializing in internal medicine, member of the Hungarian Academy of Sciences and House of Magnates.

He was the elder son of Frigyes Korányi, Sr. and brother of Frigyes Korányi, Jr. too. His mother was Malvin Bónis, of Calvinist Hungarian noble descent.
He was nominated for the Nobel prize 13 times between 1901 and 1937.

Publications
 Vizsgálatok a vizeletelválasztó rendszer működésére vonatkozóan ép és kóros viszonyok között (Magy. Orv. Archívum, 1894)
 Beiträge zur Theorie und Therapie der Niereninsuffizienz (Berliner klinische Wochenschrift, 1899)
 Physikalische Chemie und Medizin (co-author Richter P. F., I–II. Leipzig, 1907–08)
 A leukaemia kezelése benzollal (Orv. Hetit. 1912)
 Functionelle Pathologie und Therapie der Nierenkrankheiten (Berlin, 1929; in Hungarian: Bp., 1930)
 Élettan és orvosi tudomány (Orvosképzés, 1932)
 Az öregedésről (Orvosképzés, 1937).

External links
 Magyar életrajzi lexikon I. (A–K). ed. Ágnes Kenyeres. Budapest: Akadémiai. 1967. pp. 968–969. 
 Orvostörténet: Korányi
 OGYK

1866 births
1944 deaths
Physicians from Budapest
Sandor
Members of the Hungarian Academy of Sciences
Hungarian Roman Catholics
20th-century Hungarian physicians
19th-century Hungarian physicians